Communist Party of Slovakia (in Slovak: Komunistická strana Slovenska – 91, KSS '91) was a communist party in Slovakia from 1991 to 1992.

KSS '91 was formed by orthodox elements of the original Communist Party of Slovakia (KSS), which opposed the mutation of KSS into the Party of the Democratic Left. KSS '91 was registered at the Slovak authorities on March 6, 1991.

The first party conference was held on June 29–30, 1991 in Zvolen.

KSS '91 contested the 1992 elections in the Czech and Slovak Federative Republic. KSS '91 promoted keeping the unity of Czechoslovakia.

The party developed links to the Communist League of Slovakia (ZKS). In 1992, KSS '91 and ZKS merged to form the new Communist Party of Slovakia.

References 

Communist parties in Slovakia
Defunct political parties in Slovakia
Political parties established in 1991
Political parties disestablished in 1992
1991 establishments in Czechoslovakia